Sydney Boys High School (”SBHS”), otherwise known as The Sydney High School (“SHS”) or High, is a government-funded single-sex academically selective secondary day school for boys, located at Moore Park, New South Wales, a suburb within the City of Sydney council, in Sydney, New South Wales, Australia.

Established in 1883 and operated by the New South Wales Department of Education, as a school within the Port Jackson Education Area of the Sydney Region, the school has approximately 1,200 students from Year 7 to Year 12 — a number greater than most, if not all, other selective state schools — and is situated adjacent to its "sister school", Sydney Girls' High School. The school is a member of the Athletic Association of the Great Public Schools of New South Wales (AAGPS). Sydney Boys High School is an academically selective high school conducted by the NSW Department of Education.

The school was  moved to its current site at Moore Park in 1928. The school is bounded by Moore Park, Anzac Parade, Sydney Girls High School and Cleveland Street.

The school regularly ranks highly among schools in New South Wales in terms of academic achievement, ranking 5th in the state in the 2017 Higher School Certificate, and has produced numerous notable alumni, or "Old Boys".

History
Although Fort Street High School was established as an elementary school in 1849, Sydney Boys High School was the first state high school in New South Wales and Australia. It was created under Premier Henry Parkes' public education system in the early 1880s, following the Public Instruction Act 1880 (NSW). Whereas Fort Street Model School as it was founded took primary and secondary students neither Sydney Boys nor Sydney Girls High School has ever had a primary education division and are thus the first NSW state high schools founded for the express purpose of secondary education.

Alternatively known as The Sydney High School, due to its being the first state high school, Sydney High School was established as two single-sex schools sharing a single building, with boys and girls on separate floors. The first day of instruction, for 46 boys, was October 1, 1883 and was at a building located in Castlereagh Street in the Sydney central business district, which was designed by Francis Greenway and constructed by convicts. From 1883 to 1892, Sydney Boys occupied the lower floor and entered from the Castlereagh Street side of the building, whereas Sydney Girls occupied the upper floor and entered from the Elizabeth Street side. In 1924, this building would be demolished and both schools would, in 1921, have relocated to Moore Park. Presently, this site is home to the Elizabeth Street store of David Jones.

In 1892, the boys' school was relocated to Mary Ann Street in Ultimo.

In 1906, Sydney Boys High School became a member of the Athletic Association of the Great Public Schools of New South Wales (AAGPS or GPS). (The term "public school" here has the meaning as used in the United Kingdom; that is, a private school.) It is the sporting association's only government school member.

In 1928, the school moved to its current location at Moore Park, on the fringe of inner-city Sydney. This site was designed by George McRae, who also designed the Queen Victoria Building. This site was previously the Moore Park Zoo, which was relocated to Mosman as Taronga Zoo.

List of officers 

Headmaster was renamed to principal in 1992.

The Sydney High School Old Boys' Union lapsed from 1895 to 1901 due to lack of enrolments.

Academic

Enrolments
The Sydney Boys High School Year 7 intake is of around 180 students, but prospective students in higher years may matriculate to the school if vacancies exist. Offers of admission and matriculation into the school in Year 7 are made on the basis of academic merit, as assessed by the Selective High School Placement Test.

In Years 7 to 8, the cohorts consist of 180 students in each year; in Years 9 to 12, however, the cohorts consist of 210 students in each year. The size of these cohorts are described by the 2001 SBHS Enrolment Policy.

Once admitted and matriculated, students are further grouped according to their strengths and/or weaknesses, or to their abilities, such as a weakness in English relative to mathematics or "general ability", as estimated by the Selective High School Placement Test, or a proven proficiency in music, as demonstrated by a formal qualification (e.g., Australian Music Examinations Board grades) in music.

Academic results
Sydney Boys High School, like other academically selective schools and given the nature of its selective admissions criteria, has been historically known and is known for its academic achievement in the Higher School Certificate.

The following table shows the school's rankings relative to other schools in the state. The rankings are based on the percentage of exams sat that resulted in a placing on the Distinguished Achievers List (highest band result) as shown by the NSW Board of Studies (now BOSTES NSW).

Departments
The curriculum, endorsed by the New South Wales Education Standards Authority, is taught by the following 12 departments:

English
English
Mathematics
Mathematics
Science
Biology
Chemistry
Physics
Computing studies
Information processes and technology
Industrial arts
Engineering 

Music
Music 1
Music 2 and music extension
Visual arts
Visual arts
History
Ancient history
Modern history
History extension
Social science
Economics
Legal studies
Languages other than english (LOTE)
Classical languages
Latin

Modern Languages
French
Chinese
German

Grounds, buildings, and facilities
The current Moore Park site hosts the Great Hall, other school buildings, tennis courts, a gymnasium, the Junior Quadrangle, and the Flat, a common low-lying area of land between Sydney Boys and Sydney Girls' High Schools. The school buildings include approximately 60 classrooms, two change rooms, the Junior Library (for Years 7–9), and the Senior Library (for Years 10–12). 
Nearby to the school are a number of sports facilities, such as the tennis courts opposite to the Sydney Boys and Girls High Schools, located on Cleveland Street, and the facilities at Centennial Park.

Sydney Boys High School is affiliated with other facilities such as the Outterside Centre (the school boatshed located in Abbotsford) and the ANZAC Rifle Range. In addition to this, the school owns a number of vehicles, which it utilises to travel to sporting events, such as the annual The Armidale School versus the High School sporting exchange Armidale and the Head of the River at the Sydney International Regatta Centre.

In addition, SBHS has its own cadet unit, which won the 23 Battalion AFX Trophy in 2012 and 2013.

Co- and extracurricular activities

Debating and public speaking

It has also achieved notability in debating, having won the Hume Barbour trophy and Karl Cramp trophy 26 times and 14 times respectively, more than any other school.

SBHS also competes in the Lawrence Campbell Oratory Competition and the GPS debating competition. The SBHS First Grade debating team have won the GPS Debating premiership 19 times, most recently for 4 consecutive years from 2015 to 2018.

Sport
Sydney Boys High School has a long tradition of sports, in addition to academic scholarship and, stipulating that students must participate in sports until Year 11, offers students a wide range of sports, including:

Athletics
Association football (soccer), AAGPS (NSW) Soccer
Basketball, AAGPS (NSW) Basketball
Cricket
Cross country running
Fencing
Rifle shooting
Rowing
Rugby union, AAGPS (NSW) Rugby
Sailing
Swimming
Table tennis
Tennis
Volleyball
Water polo (in the combined GPS/CAS competition)

Sydney Boys High School is the sole state-operated member school of the Athletic Association of the Great Public Schools of New South Wales since 1906. It therefore competes against other GPS schools in many of the aforementioned sports, including the traditional English public school sports of cricket, rowing, and rugby union. Accordingly, and unusually for a state school, the school possess rowing facilities at the Outterside Centre at Abbotsford, which includes a dormitory, boat sheds, and three pontoons; playing fields at Centennial Park, with the Fairland Pavilion and the McKay Oval, a fenced cricket ground; and, facilities at the ANZAC Rifle Range, which are managed by the Sydney High School Rifle Club.

School traditions

House system
Each student at Sydney Boys High School is placed into one of six houses, and each year is evenly divided into these houses. These houses, named after early Old Boys who have significantly contributed to and served the school, are:

As of late, these houses, as at the Year 7 intake, have been grouped according to the strengths and weaknesses of the students, with an outrider class, English skills enhancement class, music proficiency class, sports proficiency class, and language preference class. In addition to these, an English enrichment group and a general abilities group may also be formed.

Notable actions

Sydney Boys High School has, from time to time, caught the attention of the media and/or the general public. Like other schools, it has seen several (then) minorities matriculate to it and graduate from it, including non-British, non-Irish European minorities, such as Italian Australians, Maltese Australians, and Greek Australians. In 2002, the school had the attention of the media over comments made by Old Boys made in regard to its ethnic composition — mostly East Asian and South Asian.

In 2002, "[Sydney Boys High School] wanted a more sophisticated admissions process, and more freedom to choose its own students." In 2002, it was proposed that, of the 180 Year 7 places, 30 places would be allocated each year on the basis of the Selective Schools Entrance Test (with no extended writing requirement), a detailed curriculum vitae, two school reports, and their achievements in civic, sporting, community, and leadership involvement, similar to the manner by which students are admitted to some private schools.

In 2013, the school was again featured in the media for its proposal to modify its selection criteria. This proposal involved reserving 30 places of the annual Year 7 intake of 180 places for local boys who live within  of the school. Connolly stated that "any racial undertones to earlier campaigns were a thing of the past" and that "the benefit for the school this time is about tying it to its local community". The proposal would, in theory, reduce the load on overcrowded local high schools. However, this proposal was rejected, as stated in a Sydney Morning Herald article. and would be a short-term resolution to the problem.

As of the 2012 edition of the New South Wales Department of Education and Communities statistics, more than 80% of the students enrolled at Sydney Boys High School have a language background other than English; however, this is not to suggest that these students and their parents or guardians are all recent immigrants or not proficient in English or, broadly, that the school is not necessarily lacking in diversity.

In recent years, an increasing number of "sport[s] imports" have been admitted in latter years, to bolster the school's ability to more competitively participate in sports against other members of the AAGPS. This drew allegations of Sydney Boys High School of being unmeritocratic in its selection process. Furthermore, in part due to the English public school nature of the school and the AAGPS, of which the school is a member, claims of nepotism and other favouritism have been levelled against the school. Brothers, sons, and grandsons of students or Old Boys have been allowed to enrol, though they may not have met the rigorous selection criteria. Some old boys, however, argue that where former graduates living in the community have sons and guardians at the school there is greater parental involvement at the school.

One eminent alumnus of the school, James Spigelman, former Chief Justice of New South Wales, said in an address at the school dated 16 February 1999, that:
... Our careers are particular manifestations of the ability of this school, by reason of its tradition of selection on the grounds of academic excellence, to make available opportunities to persons from backgrounds which may otherwise restrict such opportunities. The ability to obtain an education which is pitched at a level appropriate to the capacities of particular students, is the basis for the equality of opportunity, to which I have referred. ...

Notable alumni 

Sydney Boys High School has produced numerous prominent alumni, referred to as "Old Boys". Many graduates are active in alumni organisations, such as the Sydney High School Old Boys Union (OBU), the High Club, and High Rugby Friends.

Scott Morrison, Prime Minister of Australia (2018-2022), is an alumnus of Sydney Boys High School.

See also

List of government schools in New South Wales
List of selective high schools in New South Wales

References

External links 
 

Boys' schools in New South Wales
Educational institutions established in 1883
 
Public high schools in Sydney
1883 establishments in Australia
Selective schools in New South Wales
Moore Park, New South Wales
Athletic Association of the Great Public Schools of New South Wales